Prairie Township is a township in 
Mahaska County, Iowa, USA.

References

Mahaska County, Iowa
Townships in Iowa